Mordecai (Max) Gorelik (August 25, 1899 – March 7, 1990) was an American theatrical designer, producer and director.

Life and work
Born August 25, 1899, in Shchedrin near Minsk, Russia, Mordecai (Max) Gorelik immigrated with his family to the United States in 1905 to escape the pogroms that killed most of his family.  After graduating from the Pratt Institute of Fine Arts in Brooklyn in 1920, he worked for a time with Robert Edmond Jones, the pioneer American set designer who became his mentor.

Gorelik rendered in a wide variety of media and styles working with the most famous designers of the 1920s and 1930s – Robert Edmond Jones, Lee Strasberg, Elia Kazan, Arthur Miller, Norman Bel Geddes, Lee Simonson, Jo Mielziner, Oliver Messel, Aleksandr Golovin, Henri Matisse, André Derain, and Cleon Throckmorton.  He worked for the most prestigious companies—the Provincetown Players, the Theatre Guild on Broadway, the Group Theatre New York, and the Actors Laboratory Theater in Hollywood. In keeping with his love of experimental theatre, he was involved with the most avant-garde companies of the day—the New Playwrights Theatre, the Theatre Collective, the Theatre of Action, and the Theatre Union.

His first encounter with Bertolt Brecht in 1935 deeply influenced both his theories and designs. He became an advocate for the Epic Theater style developed by Brecht and director Erwin Piscator, and he pioneered the deliberate employment of metaphor in design. A decade later, he served as a designer and director for the Biarritz American University in France where he began teaching a seminar known as "The Scenic Imagination." It won national recognition as an original, inspiring, and incisive approach to the purely creative side of stage production in script, direction, acting, and design. This study was in unique contrast to the vocational method known as stagecraft, taught everywhere else. Four years later, he also acted as an Expert Consultant in Theater for the American Military Government in Germany. His command of French and German languages enabled him to network with amateur and professional theatres around the globe.

As a leading American expert on the modern stage form, his reputation was based in part on his record as a stage and film designer and in part on the years of research he carried out, abroad, under the John Simon Guggenheim Memorial Foundation Fellowship (1936–37).

In 1949-50, Gorelik was catapulted to great heights working with the National Theatre Conference and the Rockefeller Foundation Grant (1949–51) to produce Europe Onstage. 
   
He writes:

“The purpose of this book is to put on record the basic realities of the European theatre at the halfway mark of the 20th century. With that in view, I spent more than a year and a half in nine European countries: Italy, France, Germany, Austria, Switzerland, Czechoslovakia, Poland, England, and Ireland. Everywhere I attended plays, talked with stage people and consulted the dramatic theories and criticisms that came to hand. Since I am convinced that modern theatre, especially, cannot be understood except in relation to the state of mind its public, I have tried, very briefly, to give some notion of what that is like in each of the countries I have visited. This journey has been a fascinating experience, but in some ways a terrible one. America has thus far been spared --and I hope may always be spared-- the vast destruction and unleashed mass insanity that descended upon Europe ...."

He aspired to provide a precise knowledge of post-war problems with theatres across Western Europe. Because he spoke French and German fluently, he was able to examine many layers of people working in theatres across different cultures. He found the social and political health of a nation could be measured by the way it treated its artists.

For example, correspondence from the Office of the United States High Commissioner for Germany tallied the destruction of German theatres. In 1943 there were 418 dramatic companies in operation. Just six years later, 98 theatres were completely destroyed and 114 dramatic companies remained in operation; 88 were subsidized by the State and 26 were private. Individual freedoms are not valued in a culture torn by fear, hate, and envy. Innovation, breaking down barriers, and challenging the status quo was a threatening prospect in war-torn societies. As artists and craftsmen didn't regroup and failed to rebuild, universities became havens of avant garde commentary in response to the general cultural crisis.

This study affected Gorelik deeply. He worked with amateur and professional theatres around the globe. He influenced stage design, helped define the designer's role in the production process, and gave a voice to the silent majority. He went on to design the sets for 40 Broadway plays. He worked in New York and California for 50 years as a director, designer, author, and critic. His career spanned 3/4 of the 20th century and he taught at several universities.

A Fulbright Grant (1967) he received enabled him to examine Australian theatre in a similar way. He traveled to Japan, India, and Israel as well. Across cultures, Gorelik found the theatre was not merely an institution for self-expression; it was a tool for shaping history, especially where there was upheaval. Through the Arts, audiences were allowed to explore issues, become more liberal, and make social and political changes. That's why he often said in his articles and lectures that the future of theatre in America lay in its universities—where the central concern of this remarkable form of communication was its responsibility to its audience.

Gorelik's first book, New Theatres for Old (1940), became a classic textbook used in scores of American universities. His articles were published by numerous sources including Encyclopædia Britannica, Collier's Encyclopedia, Encyclopedia Americana, Drama Survey, and Theatre Arts Magazine. As a noted critic and scholar, his essays appeared in The New York Times, The New York Herald Tribune, The Arts, Educational Theatre Journal, Speech Association Quarterly, Tulane Drama Review, Contact Magazine, Davidlo (Prague), Tester-forbundets Medlemsblad (Stockholm), Teatr Y Dramaturgia (Moscow), Buhnentechenische Rundschau (Berlin), Theatre Newsletter (London), and Hollywood Quarterly.

On Broadway, Max designed forty sets. His career began with John Howard Lawson's vaudevillian critique of Americana, Processional, and ended in 1960 with A Distant Bell. He was also the translator and adapter of The Firebugs (1963), by Swiss playwright Max Frisch.  His more notable scene designs include such plays as Men in White, Golden Boy, Casey Jones, All My Sons, Desire Under the Elms, The Flowering Peach, A Hatful of Rain, The Plough and the Stars, Volpone, Tortilla Flat , King Hunger, Processional, and Mother. His film designs include L'Ennemi Publique No. 1 and None But the Lonely Heart.

Gorelik was previously an instructor-designer for the School of Theatre, New York City (1921–22), and was on the faculty of the American Academy of Dramatic Arts (1926–32), the Drama Workshop of the New School for Social Research (1940–41), Biarritz (Fr.) American University (1943–46), University of Toledo (1956), University of Miami (1956), New York University (1956), Bard College (1959), and Brigham Young University (1961), San Jose State College (1965), California State University (Los Angeles 1964, 1966), University of Massachusetts (Boston), Pratt Institute, Long Island University (Brooklyn), and University of Hawaii. From 1960 to 1972, he taught classes and staged plays at Southern Illinois University (Carbondale) as a Research Professor in Theater. As an Emeritus Professor on theater research, his work was anthologized in Best Short Plays of the World Theater' (1976). Upon his retirement he continued to teach, design, direct, and focused primarily on his playwriting.

He received an Honorary Doctorate of Humane Letters from Southern Illinois University (1972).  Other awards include the Theta Alpha Phi Award (1971); Adjudicator, American College Theatre Festival, Region VIII (1980); U.S. Institute for Theatre Technology Award (1981), Fellowship, Award, American Theatre Association (1982). He sponsored the ACTF Mordecai Gorelik Award in Scenic Design (1981) and the Southern Illinois University Mordecai Gorelik Scholarship in Scenic Design (1983).

According to Anne Fletcher in Rediscovering Mordecai Gorelik: Scene Design and the American Theatre, “When the field was in its infancy, he influenced stage design, helped define the designer's role in the production process, and challenged the American stage in theory and practice.” 

Gorelik married Frances Strauss in 1936. They had two children: a son Eugene Gorelik and a daughter Linda Gorelik. Frances Gorelik died on June 5, 1966. Loraine Kabler became his second wife in 1972. He died of cancer on March 7, 1990, in Sarasota, Florida.

References

External links
Guide to the Mordecai Gorelik Play Scripts. Special Collections and Archives, The UC Irvine Libraries, Irvine, California.
Mordecai Gorelik Papers, 1900-1975 at Southern Illinois University Carbondale, Special Collections Research Center.
"Mordecai Gorelic, Theatrical Designer and Playwright, 90", New York Times obituary, March 10, 1990

1990 deaths
1899 births
People from Zhlobin District
People from Bobruysky Uyezd
Belarusian Jews
Emigrants from the Russian Empire to the United States
American people of Belarusian-Jewish descent
20th-century American dramatists and playwrights
American scenic designers
Broadway set designers
American theatre managers and producers
American theatre directors
Theatre designers
Southern Illinois University faculty
San Jose State University faculty